Dawid Pakulski (born 23 July 1998) is a Polish professional footballer who plays as a midfielder for Zagłębie Lubin II.

References

External links

Polish footballers
1998 births
Living people
Zagłębie Lubin players
Motor Lublin players
Ekstraklasa players
II liga players
III liga players
IV liga players
Association football midfielders